Arirang F.C. is an association football club based in the Philippines. Coached by Kim Chul-So and made out of entirely of Korean expatriates, they played in the semi-professional Filipino Premier League, which is now defunct. The club plays at Panaad Stadium, a football stadium with a capacity of 15,500.

References

Football clubs in the Philippines
Sports in Negros Occidental